Edl Schamiloglu (born 1959) is an American physicist, electrical engineer, pulsed power expert, inventor, and distinguished professor in the Department of Electrical and Computer Engineering at the University of New Mexico. He has been known in public media for his expertise in the design and operation of directed-energy weapons. He is also known for his assessment on the possible origins of alleged health damages presumably caused on U.S. embassy personnel in Cuba in 2016 as part of the Havana syndrome incident. He is the Associate Dean for research and innovation at the UNM School of Engineering, where he has been a faculty since 1988, and where he is also Special Assistant to the Provost for Laboratory Relations. He is also the founding director of the recently launched UNM Directed Energy Center. Schamiloglu is a book author and co-editor, and has received numerous awards from prestigious bodies for his academic achievements. He is a Fellow of the Institute of Electrical and Electronics Engineers and the American Physical Society.

Early life and education 
Schamiloglu was born in The Bronx in 1959 to Tatar parents from Russia who wed in Istanbul in 1957, where their families had independently arrived as political refugees. His only brother, Uli Schamiloglu, is Professor and chair of the department of Kazakh Language and Turkic Studies at Nazarbayev University in Nursultan, Kazakhstan.

Schamiloglu attended Bronx High School of Science. In 1979, he obtained a Bachelor of Science in applied physics and applied mathematics and  a Master of Science degree in plasma physics from Columbia University. In 1988, he earned a PhD in engineering (with a minor in mathematics) from Cornell University.

Career 

Schamiloglu has been a faculty member at University of New Mexico since 1988. At the UNM School of Engineering, he has successively been Regents’ Lecturer from 1996 to1999, ECE Gardner-Zemke Professor at the Electrical and Computer Engineering Department (since 2000), and Distinguished Professor since 2014. Also at the University of New Mexico, he has been associate chair and director of the Graduate Program (2000–2001), director of the School of Engineering Research Center (COSMIAC) since 2018, associate dean for research and innovation (2015–2017), and special assistant to the provost for laboratory relations since 2017. He is also president of the UNM Summa Foundation.

At University of New Mexico, he established a program for research and education in plasma science involving pulsed power and intense beam-driven, high power microwave devices. He founded the Pulsed Power, Beams and Microwaves Laboratory (1989), where for many years his team have been pursuing research in areas such as modeling of electromagnetic systems, directed energy microwaves, and the effects of high power microwaves on systems.

Acting as a principal investigator, or leading multilateral alliances, Schamiloglu's laboratory has received research subsidies of millions of dollars often originating from the US Department of Defense, In 2020, he led a five-university inter-institutional team sponsored by the Air Force, which was selected for a Multidisciplinary University Research Initiative (MURI) Award from the United States Department of Defense to explore the Fundamental Limits to High Power Electromagnetic Amplification.

As a principal co-investigator, in 2021 Schamiloglu became a founding member of the NSF International-sponsored Directorate for Engineering's Engineering Research Visioning Alliance (ERVA), together with Dorota Grejner-Brzezińska from The Ohio State University, Anthony Boccanfuso from the University Industry Demonstration Partnership (UIDP), Barry W. Johnson from the University of Virginia, and Charles Johnson-Bey, of Booz Allen Hamilton.

Schamiloglu has taught electromagnetics, plasma physics, neurosystems engineering, and advanced mathematics. He has been an invited lecturer at institutions in the US, UK, India and China. He has supervised over sixty M.S. and Ph.D. dissertations in related fields. Also, his laboratory has hosted many international visiting scientists since 1991.

As a special Assistant to the provost, Schamiloglu has been aiding in the development of working relations between the University of New Mexico and United States Department of Energy national laboratories

.

He was elected a Fellow of the Institute of Electrical and Electronics Engineers (IEEE) in 2002, and a Fellow of the American Physical Society in 2020.

Works

Papers 
Schamiloglu has published over 400 peer-reviewed academic articles. His work has been cited 8,100 times (Google scholar, Aug 29, 2021). Some of his most cited papers are:

 Fuks, Mikhail; Schamiloglu, Edl (2005-11-10). "Rapid Start of Oscillations in a Magnetron with a "Transparent" Cathode". Physical Review Letters. 95 (20): 205101. . .
 Schamiloglu, Edl (2014-08-18). "Enhanced surface flashover strength in vacuum of polymethylmethacrylate by surface modification using atmospheric-pressure dielectric barrier discharge". Applied Physics Letters. 105 (7): 071607. . .
 Fuks, Mikhail I; Schamiloglu, Edl (2010-06). "70% Efficient Relativistic Magnetron With Axial Extraction of Radiation Through a Horn Antenna". IEEE Transactions on Plasma Science. 38 (6): 1302–1312. .

Books 

 High-Power Microwave Sources and Technologies (2001), Robert J. Barker, Edl Schamiloglu (co-editors), New York: IEEE Press/Wiley. 2001. . .
 High Power Microwaves, 3rd edition (2015), James Benford, John A. Swegle, Edl Schamiloglu (authors), CRC Press. . 
 High-Power Microwave Sources and Technologies using Metamaterials (2021) John W. Luginsland, Jason A. Marshall, Arje Nachman, Edl Schamiloglu (co-editors), New York: Wiley/IEEE Press, . .

Service 
Schamiloglu has often been a committee member and chair at UNM, IEEE and National Academy. He served on the external advisory board for Sandia National Laboratories, REHEDS Foundation, Army's Extramural Basic Research Program in Electronics (ARO), K&A Wireless, Directed Energy Professional Society, Pulsed Power Conferences, Inc., SUMMA, and EPSCoR/IDeA Foundations. He was also founding member (2016-2020) of the Matter and Radiation at Extremes Editorial Advisory Board (an Open Access Journal), and an editor for IEEE Transactions on Communications.

Patents 
Schamiloglu is a co-inventor of several patents for devices often related to the operation of magnetrons.

Honors 
Schamiloglu's academic achievements have been recognized by many awards. Within UNM he received Research Excellence Awards in 1992, 2001 and 2017, also Creativity Awards in 2011, 2012, 2013, 2018 and 2019. He was selected as a UNM Academic Leadership Fellow from 2013 to 2015, and received the Gardner-Zemke Research Award in 2016.

Within the Institute of Electrical and Electronics Engineers (IEEE), his awards include:

 2002: Elected Fellow “For Contributions to the Generation and Propagation of Intense Pulsed Charged Particle Beams”
 2008: Albuquerque Section Outstanding Engineering Educator Award
 2013: Nuclear and Plasma Sciences Society's Richard F. Shea Distinguished Member Award “For Outstanding Contributions to its Technical Committees”
 2015: NPSS PPST Peter Haas Award “For Research in the Area of Pulsed Power, Beams, and Microwaves, and for his Dedicated Service to the Current and Future Pulsed Power Community through his Leadership and Educational Endeavors”
 2019: Nuclear and Plasma Sciences Society's 2019 Magne “Kris” Kristiansen Award for Contributions to Experimental Nuclear and Plasma Science

Other awards he has received include:

 2003: City of Albuquerque Goodwill Ambassador Award
 2011: CST (Journal) University Publication Award
 2012: AFOSR 60th Anniversary Commemorative Medal for Leadership in Directed Energy
 2014: IEC 1906 Leadership Award, given for his service leading SC77C
 2016: Institute of Physics (UK) Outstanding Reviewer Award for Journal of Physics D: Applied Physics
 2020: Elected Fellow of the Americal Physical Society

References

1959 births
Living people
Columbia University alumni
Cornell University alumni
Fellow Members of the IEEE
Fellows of the American Physical Society
20th-century American physicists
21st-century American physicists
University of New Mexico faculty
Scientists from the Bronx
Electrical engineering academics
Microwave engineers
20th-century American engineers
21st-century American engineers
American people of Tatar descent
20th-century American inventors
21st-century American inventors
American electrical engineers